了 is a Chinese character meaning "completion" or "understanding." It may refer to:

 le, marker for the perfective aspect in standard Chinese grammar
 Satoru, Japanese masculine given name
 Ryō (given name), Japanese unisex given name